Perpetual energy may refer to:

 Perpetual motion, the property of an imaginary device that, once started, continues to move forever with no input of external energy
 Renewable energy, energy collected from resources that are naturally replenished on a human timescale
 Perpetual Energy Inc, a Canadian company owned by Clay Riddell
 Perpetual Energies, a 1987 studio album by Ray Buttigieg
 "Perpetual Energy" (Cow and Chicken), an episode of Cow and Chicken

See also
Infinite energy (disambiguation)
Free energy (disambiguation)